Christian Friedrich (or Frederick) Wilhelm von der Ahe (October 7, 1851 – June 5, 1913) was a German-American entrepreneur, best known as the owner of the St. Louis Brown Stockings of the American Association, now known as the St. Louis Cardinals.

Career
Born in the fall of 1851 in Hille, Germany (Prussia), von der Ahe immigrated alone to New York City around 1870, but quickly moved to St. Louis, where he worked as a clerk in a grocery store. Later, he bought out the store owner and expanded business by establishing a saloon in the back of the store. Von der Ahe noticed that a number of his patrons visited the saloon after baseball games, so in 1882 he bought the bankrupt and scandal-ridden St. Louis Brown Stockings baseball franchise for $1,800 and joined the American Association baseball league. He named the team the Browns and hired future Chicago White Sox owner Charles Comiskey to play first base and eventually manage the team.

Von der Ahe took a very active role in the team, even though he knew almost nothing about baseball. Other than player/manager/owner Albert Spalding, Von der Ahe was the first baseball owner with a significant public persona, the predecessor of Bill Veeck, Charlie Finley and George Steinbrenner in this regard.  With his thick German accent ("I am der poss bresident of der Prowns!"), bushy mustache and showmanship, he was as much of a story as his players.

The Browns dominated the American Association, winning four straight league championships starting in 1885, and the baseball, beer, and other investments made von der Ahe wealthy. He made $500,000 off the baseball team alone. He set the ticket price at 25 cents, hoping fans would spend money on beer. As a result, the Browns led the league in attendance and soon had to expand his ballpark. The term fan (from fanatic) is sometimes attributed to von der Ahe.

In 1885, von der Ahe erected a larger-than-life statue outside of Sportsman's Park, not of any of his star players, but of himself. A sportswriter from Denver mockingly dubbed the statue "Von der Ahe discovers Illinois." Although eccentric, von der Ahe made a number of innovations, including operating a farm club called the St. Louis Whites. Also, tradition holds that von der Ahe was the first to sell hot dogs at the ballpark, although some historians dispute this. Von der Ahe billed himself as the "Millionaire Sportsman".

In 1887, after a poor showing in the World Series, the ill-tempered von der Ahe threatened to withhold his players' share of the earnings. In 1891, he was also majority owner of the Cincinnati Kelly's Killers, which played for part of one season in the American Association. In 1892 the team joined the National League after the American Association folded. By this time, Comiskey had lost patience with von der Ahe and left for the Cincinnati Reds. Without Comiskey, the Browns quickly became a last-place team.

Legal problems plagued von der Ahe's ownership, especially in the later years. In an effort to recoup his losses, in 1892 he moved to a larger ballpark, which he surrounded with an amusement park, complete with beer garden, a horse track in the outfield, a "shoot-the-shoots" water flume ride, and an artificial lake (used for ice skating in winter). The league, which prohibited gambling on its grounds, disapproved of the race track; so did von der Ahe's outfielders. The press called the facility "Coney Island West" and nicknamed von der Ahe "Von der Ha Ha."

With losses still piling up, von der Ahe resorted to selling off his best players, mostly to Brooklyn. In 1898, part of the ballpark burned down during an April game with Chicago; his second wife divorced him; and his bondsman kidnapped him for not paying his debts. In a highly publicized trial connected with the fire, von der Ahe lost his baseball team. The Browns changed hands twice and changed their name twice, first to the Perfectos (1899) and then to the Cardinals (1900). The American League team known as the St. Louis Browns from 1902 to 1953 had no connection to von der Ahe's team aside from the name, which was designed to invoke the memory of the 1885–1889 era.

Von der Ahe soon lost his other wealth as well and was reduced to tending bar in a small saloon. Comiskey frequently sent von der Ahe money to help make ends meet. In April 1908, the St. Louis Cardinals and St. Louis Browns played each other in a benefit game for him. The club raised $4,300.

Death
Due to a life of heavy alcohol consumption, he died of cirrhosis of the liver on June 5, 1913. He was buried in Bellefontaine Cemetery in St. Louis, with the statue that once stood in front of Sportsman's Park adorning his grave.

Tribute
In 2015 Von der Ahe was named to the Pre-Integration Committee ballot for the National Baseball Hall of Fame.

References

Further reading
Achorn, Edward, The Summer of Beer and Whiskey: How Brewers, Barkeeps, Rowdies, Immigrants, and a Wild Pennant Fight Made Baseball America's Game, 978-1610392600, 2013
Egenriether, Richard. "Chris Von der Ahe: Baseball's Pioneering Huckster." Nine: A Journal of Baseball History and Social Policy Perspectives, v. 7:no.2. Edmonton, Alberta. 1999. Also abbr. in Baseball Research Journal, v.18. SABR: Cleveland, Ohio. 1989.
Hetrick, J. Thomas. Chris Von der Ahe and the St. Louis Browns. Pocol Press: Clifton, Virginia. 2016. 
Hetrick, J. Thomas. Chris Von der Ahe and the St. Louis Browns. Scarecrow: Lanham, Maryland. 1999.
Rygelski, James. Chris Von der Ahe: "The Boss President." Gateway Heritage: St. Louis, Missouri. April 1992.
Seymour, Harold. Baseball: the Early Years. Oxford: New York City. 1960.
Voigt, Davis Quinten. American Baseball, v. 1: From Gentleman's Sport to the Commissioner System. University of Oklahoma Press: Norman, Oklahoma. 1966.
Voigt, Davis Quinten. American Baseball, v. 2: From Commissioners to Continental Expansion. University of Oklahoma Press: Norman, Oklahoma. 1970.
Voigt, Davis Quinten. American Baseball, v. 3: From Postwar Expansion to the Electronic Age. University of Oklahoma Press: Norman, Oklahoma. 1983.

External links
Baseball-Reference.com – managing record

1851 births
1913 deaths
Baseball executives
Burials at Bellefontaine Cemetery
Deaths from cirrhosis
German emigrants to the United States
Major League Baseball owners
People from Minden-Lübbecke
Businesspeople from North Rhine-Westphalia
St. Louis Browns (NL) managers
19th-century American businesspeople